

Events

Pre-1600
509 BC – Publius Valerius Publicola celebrates the first triumph of the Roman Republic after his victory over the deposed king Lucius Tarquinius Superbus at the Battle of Silva Arsia.
 293 – Emperor Diocletian and Maximian appoint Constantius Chlorus and Galerius as Caesars. This is considered the beginning of the Tetrarchy, known as the Quattuor Principes Mundi ("Four Rulers of the World").
 350 – Vetranio proclaims himself Caesar after being encouraged to do so by Constantina, sister of Constantius II.
 834 – Emperor Louis the Pious is restored as sole ruler of the Frankish Empire.
1476 – Forces of the Catholic Monarchs engage the combined Portuguese-Castilian armies of Afonso V and Prince John at the Battle of Toro.
1562 – Sixty-three Huguenots are massacred in Wassy, France, marking the start of the French Wars of Religion.

1601–1900
1628 – Writs issued in February by Charles I of England mandate that every county in England (not just seaport towns) pay ship tax by this date.
1633 – Samuel de Champlain reclaims his role as commander of New France on behalf of Cardinal Richelieu.
1692 – Sarah Good, Sarah Osborne and Tituba are brought before local magistrates in Salem Village, Massachusetts, beginning what would become known as the Salem witch trials.
1781 – The Articles of Confederation goes into effect in the United States.
1796 – The Dutch East India Company is nationalized by the Batavian Republic.
1805 – Justice Samuel Chase is acquitted at the end of his impeachment trial by the U.S. Senate.
1811 – Leaders of the Mamluk dynasty are killed by Egyptian ruler Muhammad Ali.
1815 – Napoleon returns to France from his banishment on Elba.
1836 – A convention of delegates from 57 Texas communities convenes in Washington-on-the-Brazos, Texas, to deliberate independence from Mexico.
1845 – United States President John Tyler signs a bill authorizing the United States to annex the Republic of Texas.
1867 – Nebraska is admitted as the 37th U.S. state.
1870 – Marshal F. S. López dies during the Battle of Cerro Corá thus marking the end of the Paraguayan War.
1871 – The victorious Prussian Army parades through Paris, France, after the end of the Siege of Paris during the Franco-Prussian War.
1872 – Yellowstone National Park is established as the world's first national park.
1893 – Electrical engineer Nikola Tesla gives the first public demonstration of radio in St. Louis, Missouri.
1896 – Battle of Adwa: An Ethiopian army defeats an outnumbered Italian force, ending the First Italo-Ethiopian War.
  1896   – Henri Becquerel discovers radioactive decay.

1901–present
1901 – The Australian Army is formed.
1910 – The deadliest avalanche in United States history buries a Great Northern Railway train in northeastern King County, Washington, killing 96 people.
1914 – China joins the Universal Postal Union.
1917 – The Zimmermann Telegram is reprinted in newspapers across the United States after the U.S. government releases its unencrypted text.
1919 – March 1st Movement begins in Korea under Japanese rule.
1921 – The Australian cricket team captained by Warwick Armstrong becomes the first team to complete a whitewash of The Ashes, something that would not be repeated for 86 years.
  1921   – Following mass protests in Petrograd demanding greater freedom in the RSFSR, the Kronstadt rebellion begins, with sailors and citizens taking up arms against the Bolsheviks.
1932 – Aviator Charles Lindbergh's 20-month-old son Charles Jr is kidnapped from his home in East Amwell, New Jersey. His body would not be found until May 12.
1939 – An Imperial Japanese Army ammunition dump explodes at Hirakata, Osaka, Japan, killing 94.
1941 – World War II: Bulgaria signs the Tripartite Pact, allying itself with the Axis powers.
1942 – World War II: Japanese forces land on Java, the main island of the Dutch East Indies, at Merak and Banten Bay (Banten), Eretan Wetan (Indramayu) and Kragan (Rembang).
1946 – The Bank of England is nationalised.
1947 – The International Monetary Fund begins financial operations.
1950 – Cold War: Klaus Fuchs is convicted of spying for the Soviet Union by disclosing top secret atomic bomb data.
1953 – Soviet Premier Joseph Stalin suffers a stroke and collapses; he dies four days later.
1954 – Nuclear weapons testing: The Castle Bravo, a 15-megaton hydrogen bomb, is detonated on Bikini Atoll in the Pacific Ocean, resulting in the worst radioactive contamination ever caused by the United States.
  1954   – Armed Puerto Rican nationalists attack the United States Capitol building, injuring five Representatives.
1956 – The International Air Transport Association finalizes a draft of the Radiotelephony spelling alphabet for the International Civil Aviation Organization.
  1956   – Formation of the East German Nationale Volksarmee.
1958 – Samuel Alphonsus Stritch is appointed Pro-Prefect of the Propagation of Faith and thus becomes the first U.S. member of the Roman Curia.
1961 – Uganda becomes self-governing and holds its first elections.
1962 – American Airlines Flight 1 crashes into Jamaica Bay in New York, killing 95.
1964 – Villarrica Volcano begins a strombolian eruption causing lahars that destroy half of the town of Coñaripe.
1966 – Venera 3 Soviet space probe crashes on Venus becoming the first spacecraft to land on another planet's surface.
  1966   – The Ba'ath Party takes power in Syria.
1971 – President of Pakistan Yahya Khan indefinitely postpones the pending national assembly session, precipitating massive civil disobedience in East Pakistan.
1973 – Black September storms the Saudi embassy in Khartoum, Sudan, resulting in the assassination of three Western hostages.
1974 – Watergate scandal: Seven are indicted for their role in the Watergate break-in and charged with conspiracy to obstruct justice.
1981 – Provisional Irish Republican Army member Bobby Sands begins his hunger strike in HM Prison Maze.
1990 – Steve Jackson Games is raided by the United States Secret Service, prompting the later formation of the Electronic Frontier Foundation.
1991 – Uprisings against Saddam Hussein begin in Iraq, leading to the deaths of more than 25,000 people, mostly civilians.
1992 – Bosnia and Herzegovina declares its independence from Socialist Federal Republic of Yugoslavia.
1998 – Titanic became the first film to gross over $1 billion worldwide.
2002 – U.S. invasion of Afghanistan: Operation Anaconda begins in eastern Afghanistan.
2003 – Management of the United States Customs Service and the United States Secret Service move to the United States Department of Homeland Security.
2005 – In Roper v. Simmons, the U.S. Supreme Court rules that the execution of juveniles found guilty of any crime is unconstitutional.
2006 – English-language Wikipedia reaches its one millionth article, Jordanhill railway station.
2007 – Tornadoes break out across the southern United States, killing at least 20 people, including eight at Enterprise High School.
2008 – The Armenian police clash with peaceful opposition rally protesting against allegedly fraudulent presidential elections, as a result ten people are killed.
2014 – Thirty-five people are killed and 143 injured in a mass stabbing at Kunming Railway Station in China.

Births

Pre-1600
1105 – Alfonso VII, king of León and Castile (d. 1157)
1389 – Antoninus of Florence, Italian archbishop and saint (d. 1459)
1432 – Isabella of Coimbra (d. 1455)
1456 – Vladislaus II of Hungary (d. 1516)
1547 – Rudolph Goclenius, German philosopher and lexicographer (d. 1628)
1554 – William Stafford, English courtier and conspirator (d. 1612)
1577 – Richard Weston, 1st Earl of Portland (d. 1635)
1597 – Jean-Charles della Faille, Flemish priest and mathematician (d. 1652)

1601–1900
1611 – John Pell, English mathematician and linguist (d. 1685)
1629 – Abraham Teniers, Flemish painter (d. 1670)
1647 – John de Brito, Portuguese Jesuit missionary and martyr (d. 1693)
1657 – Samuel Werenfels, Swiss theologian and author (d. 1740)
1683 – Tsangyang Gyatso, sixth Dalai Lama (d. 1706)
1683 – Caroline of Ansbach, British queen and regent (d. 1737)
1724 – Manuel do Cenáculo, Portuguese prelate and antiquarian (d. 1814)
1732 – William Cushing, American lawyer and judge (d. 1810)
1760 – François Buzot, French lawyer and politician (d. 1794)
1769 – François Séverin Marceau-Desgraviers, French general (d. 1796)
1807 – Wilford Woodruff, American religious leader, 4th President of The Church of Jesus Christ of Latter-day Saints (d. 1898)
1810 – Frédéric Chopin, Polish pianist and composer (d. 1849)
1812 – Augustus Pugin, English architect, co-designed the Palace of Westminster (d. 1852)
1817 – Giovanni Duprè, Italian sculptor and educator (d. 1882)
1821 – Joseph Hubert Reinkens, German bishop and academic (d. 1896)
1835 – Philip Fysh, English-Australian politician, 12th Premier of Tasmania (d. 1919)
1837 – William Dean Howells, American novelist, playwright, and critic (d. 1920)
1842 – Nikolaos Gyzis, Greek painter and academic (d. 1901)
1848 – Augustus Saint-Gaudens, Irish-American sculptor and academic (d. 1907)
1852 – Théophile Delcassé, French politician, French Minister of Foreign Affairs (d. 1923)
1863 – Alexander Golovin, Russian painter and set designer (d. 1930)
1870 – E. M. Antoniadi, Greek-French astronomer and academic (d. 1944)
1876 – Henri de Baillet-Latour, Belgian businessman (d. 1942)
1880 – Lytton Strachey, British writer and critic (d. 1932)
1886 – Oskar Kokoschka, Austrian-Swiss painter, poet, and playwright (d. 1980)
1888 – Ewart Astill, English cricketer and billiards player (d. 1948)
  1888   – Fanny Walden, English cricketer and umpire, international footballer (d. 1949)
1889 – Tetsuro Watsuji, Japanese historian and philosopher (d. 1960)
1890 – Theresa Bernstein, Polish-American painter and author (d. 2002)
1891 – Ralph Hitz, Austrian-American hotelier (d. 1940)
1892 – Ryūnosuke Akutagawa, Japanese author and educator (d. 1927)
1893 – Mercedes de Acosta, American author, poet, and playwright (d. 1968)
1896 – Dimitri Mitropoulos, Greek pianist, composer, and conductor (d. 1960)
  1896   – Moriz Seeler, German playwright and producer (d. 1942)
1899 – Erich von dem Bach-Zelewski, German SS officer (d. 1972)
1900 – Basil Bunting, British poet (d. 1985)

1901–present
1904 – Paul Hartman, American actor, singer, and dancer (d. 1973)
  1904   – Glenn Miller, American trombonist, composer, and bandleader (d. 1944)
1905 – Doris Hare, Welsh-English actress, singer, and dancer (d. 2000)
1906 – Phạm Văn Đồng, Vietnamese lieutenant and politician, 2nd Prime Minister of Vietnam (d. 2000)
1909 – Eugene Esmonde, English lieutenant and pilot (d. 1942)
  1909   – Winston Sharples, American pianist and composer (d. 1978)
1910 – Archer John Porter Martin, English chemist and academic, Nobel Prize laureate (d. 2002)
  1910   – David Niven, English soldier and actor (d. 1983)
1912 – Gerald Emmett Carter, Canadian cardinal (d. 2003)
  1912   – Boris Chertok, Polish-Russian engineer and academic (d. 2011)
1914 – Harry Caray, American sportscaster (d. 1998)
  1914   – Ralph Ellison, American novelist and literary critic (d. 1994)
1917 – Robert Lowell, American poet (d. 1977)
  1917   – Dinah Shore, American singer and actress (d. 1994)
1918 – João Goulart, Brazilian lawyer and politician, 24th President of Brazil (d. 1976)
  1918   – Gladys Spellman, American educator and politician (d. 1988)
1920 – Max Bentley, Canadian ice hockey player (d. 1984)
  1920   – Howard Nemerov, American poet and academic (d. 1991)
1921 – Cameron Argetsinger, American race car driver and lawyer (d. 2008)
  1921   – Terence Cooke, American cardinal (d. 1983)
  1921   – Richard Wilbur, American poet, translator, and essayist (d. 2017)
1922 – William Gaines, American publisher (d. 1992)
  1922   – Yitzhak Rabin, Israeli general and politician, 5th Prime Minister of Israel, Nobel Prize laureate (d. 1995)
1924 – Arnold Drake, American author and screenwriter (d. 2007)
  1924   – Deke Slayton, American soldier, pilot, and astronaut (d. 1993)
1926 – Robert Clary, French-American actor and author (d. 2022)
  1926   – Cesare Danova, Italian-American actor (d. 1992)
  1926   – Pete Rozelle, American businessman and 3rd Commissioner of the National Football League (d. 1996)
  1926   – Allan Stanley, Canadian ice hockey player and coach (d. 2013)
1927 – George O. Abell, American astronomer, professor at UCLA, science popularizer, and skeptic (d. 1983) 
  1927   – Harry Belafonte, American singer-songwriter and actor
  1927   – Robert Bork, American lawyer and scholar, United States Attorney General (d. 2012)
1928 – Jacques Rivette, French director, screenwriter, and critic (d. 2016)
1929 – Georgi Markov, Bulgarian journalist and author (d. 1978)
  1930   – Monu Mukhopadhyay, Indian Bengali actor (d. 2020)
1930 – Gastone Nencini, Italian cyclist (d. 1980)
1934 – Jean-Michel Folon, Belgian painter and sculptor (d. 2005)
  1934   – Joan Hackett, American actress (d. 1983)
1935 – Robert Conrad, American actor, radio host and stuntman (d. 2020)
1936 – Jean-Edern Hallier, French author (d. 1997)
1939 – Leo Brouwer, Cuban guitarist, composer, and conductor
  1939   – Mustansar Hussain Tarar, Pakistani author
1940 – Robin Gray, Australian politician, 37th Premier of Tasmania 
  1940   – Robert Grossman, American painter, sculptor, and author (d. 2018)
1941 – Robert Hass, American poet
  1941   – Dave Marcis, American stock car racing driver
1942 – Richard Myers, American general
1943 – Gil Amelio, American businessman
  1943   – José Ángel Iribar, Spanish footballer and manager
  1943   – Rashid Sunyaev, Russian-German astronomer and physicist
1944 – Buddhadeb Bhattacharjee, Indian politician, 7th Chief Minister of West Bengal
  1944   – John Breaux, American lawyer and politician
  1944   – Roger Daltrey, English singer-songwriter, producer, and actor
  1944   – Mike d'Abo, English singer
1945 – Dirk Benedict, American actor and director
1946 – Gerry Boulet, Canadian singer-songwriter (d. 1990)
  1946   – Jim Crace, English author and academic
1947 – Alan Thicke, Canadian-American actor and composer (d. 2016)
1951 – Sergei Kourdakov, Russian-American KGB agent (d. 1973)
1952 – Dave Barr, Canadian golfer
  1952   – Nevada Barr, American actress and author
  1952   – Leigh Matthews, Australian footballer, coach, and sportscaster
  1952   – Jerri Nielsen, American physician and explorer (d. 2009)
  1952   – Martin O'Neill, Northern Irish footballer and manager
1953 – M. K. Stalin, Indian Tamil politician, 8th and incumbent Chief Minister of Tamil Nadu
  1953   – Sinan Çetin, Turkish actor, director, and producer
  1953   – Carlos Queiroz, Portuguese footballer and manager
1954 – Catherine Bach, American actress
  1954   – Ron Howard, American actor, director, and producer
  1954   – Rod Reddy, Australian rugby league player and coach
1956 – Tim Daly, American actor, director, and producer
  1956   – Dalia Grybauskaitė, Lithuanian politician, President of Lithuania
1958 – Nik Kershaw, English singer-songwriter, guitarist, and producer
  1958   – Wayne B. Phillips, Australian cricketer and coach
1959 – Nick Griffin, English politician
1961 – Mike Rozier, American football player	
1963 – Ron Francis, Canadian ice hockey player and manager
1965 – Booker T, American wrestler and sportscaster
  1965   – Stewart Elliott, Canadian jockey
1966 – Zack Snyder, American director, producer, and screenwriter
1967 – Aron Winter, Surinamese-Dutch footballer and manager
1969 – Javier Bardem, Spanish actor and producer
1971 – Ivan Cleary, Australian rugby league player and coach
  1971   – Ma Dong-seok, South Korean-American actor
1973 – Chris Webber, American basketball player and sportscaster
1977 – Rens Blom, Dutch pole vaulter
1979 – Mikkel Kessler, Danish boxer
  1979   – Bruno Langlois, Canadian cyclist
1980 – Shahid Afridi, Pakistani cricketer
  1980   – Sercan Güvenışık, German-Turkish footballer
  1980   – Djimi Traoré, French-Malian footballer
1981 – Will Power, Australian race car driver
1983 – Daniel Carvalho, Brazilian footballer
  1983   – Lupita Nyong'o, Kenyan-Mexican actress
  1983   – Anthony Tupou, Australian rugby league player
1984 – Alexander Steen, Canadian-Swedish ice hockey player
1985 – Andreas Ottl, German footballer
1986 – Big E, American professional wrestler
  1986   – Jonathan Spector, American soccer player
1987 – Kesha, American singer-songwriter and actress
  1989   – Carlos Vela, Mexican footballer
1992 – Tom Walsh, New Zealand athlete
  1992   – Édouard Mendy, Senegalese footballer
1993 – Nathan Brown, Australian rugby league player
  1993   – Michael Conforto, American baseball player	
  1993   – Kurt Mann, Australian rugby league player
  1993   – Josh McEachran, English footballer
1994 – Justin Bieber, Canadian singer-songwriter
  1994   – Asanoyama Hideki, Japanese sumo wrestler
  1994   – Tyreek Hill, American football player
1999 – Brogan Hay, Scottish footballer
2000 – Ja'Marr Chase, American football player

Deaths

Pre-1600
 492 – Felix III, pope of the Catholic Church
 589 – David, Welsh bishop and saint 
 965 – Leo VIII, pope of the Catholic Church
 977 – Rudesind, Galician bishop (b. 907)
 991 – En'yū, Japanese emperor (b. 959)
1058 – Ermesinde of Carcassonne, countess and regent of Barcelona (b. 972)
1131 – Stephen II, king of Hungary and Croatia (b. 1101)
1233 – Thomas, count of Savoy (b. 1178)
1244 – Gruffydd ap Llywelyn Fawr, Welsh noble, son of Llywelyn the Great (b. 1200)
1320 – Ayurbarwada Buyantu Khan, Chinese emperor (b. 1286)
1383 – Amadeus VI, count of Savoy (b. 1334)
1510 – Francisco de Almeida, Portuguese soldier and explorer (b. 1450)
1546 – George Wishart, Scottish minister and martyr (b. 1513)

1601–1900
1620 – Thomas Campion, English poet and composer (b. 1567)
1633 – George Herbert, English poet and orator (b. 1593)
1643 – Girolamo Frescobaldi, Italian keyboardist and composer (b. 1583)
1661 – Richard Zouch, English judge and politician (b. 1590)
1697 – Francesco Redi, Italian physician and poet (b. 1626)
1734 – Roger North, English lawyer and author (b. 1653)
1768 – Hermann Samuel Reimarus, German philosopher and author (b. 1694)
1773 – Luigi Vanvitelli, Italian architect, designed the Palace of Caserta (b. 1700)
1792 – Leopold II, Holy Roman Emperor (b. 1747)
  1792   – Angelo Emo, Venetian admiral and statesman (b. 1731)
1841 – Claude Victor-Perrin, Duc de Belluno, French general and politician, French Minister of Defence (b. 1764)
1862 – Peter Barlow, English mathematician and physicist (b. 1776)
1875 – Tristan Corbière, French poet and educator (b. 1845)
1882 – Theodor Kullak, German pianist, composer, and educator (b. 1818)
1884 – Isaac Todhunter, English mathematician and academic (b. 1820)
1889 – William Henry Monk, English organist and composer  (b. 1823)

1901–present
1906 – José María de Pereda, Spanish author (b. 1833)
1911 – Jacobus Henricus van 't Hoff, Dutch-German chemist and academic, Nobel Prize laureate (b. 1852)
1914 – Gilbert Elliot-Murray-Kynynmound, 4th Earl of Minto, English soldier and politician, 8th Governor General of Canada (b. 1845)
1920 – John H. Bankhead, American lawyer and politician (b. 1842)
1922 – Pichichi, Spanish footballer (b. 1892)
1925 – Homer Plessy, American political activist (b. 1862 or 1863)
1932 – Frank Teschemacher, American Jazz musician (b. 1906)  
1936 – Mikhail Kuzmin, Russian author and poet (b. 1871)
1938 – Gabriele D'Annunzio, Italian journalist and politician (b. 1863)
1940 – A. H. Tammsaare, Estonian author (b. 1878)
1942 – George S. Rentz, American commander (b. 1882)
1943 – Alexandre Yersin, Swiss-French physician and bacteriologist (b. 1863)
1952 – Mariano Azuela, Mexican physician and author (b. 1873)
1966 – Fritz Houtermans, Polish-German physicist and academic (b. 1903)
1974 – Bobby Timmons, American pianist and composer (b. 1935)
1976 – Jean Martinon, French conductor and composer (b. 1910)
1978 – Paul Scott, English author, poet, and playwright (b. 1920)
1979 – Mustafa Barzani, Iraqi-Kurdistan politician (b. 1903)
1980 – Wilhelmina Cooper, Dutch-American model and businesswoman, founded Wilhelmina Models (b. 1940)
  1980   – Dixie Dean, English footballer (b. 1907)
1983 – Arthur Koestler, Hungarian-English journalist and author (b. 1905)
1984 – Jackie Coogan, American actor (b. 1914)
1988 – Joe Besser, American comedian and actor (b. 1907)
1989 – Vasantdada Patil, Indian politician, 5th Chief Minister of Maharashtra (b. 1917)
1991 – Edwin H. Land, American scientist and businessman, co-founded the Polaroid Corporation (b. 1909)
1995 – César Rodríguez Álvarez, Spanish footballer and manager (b. 1920)
  1995   – Georges J. F. Köhler, German biologist and academic, Nobel Prize laureate (b. 1946)
1998 – Archie Goodwin, American author and illustrator (b. 1937)
2004 – Mian Ghulam Jilani, Pakistani general (b. 1914)
2006 – Peter Osgood, English footballer (b. 1947)
  2006   – Jack Wild, English actor (b.1952)
  2006   – Nurasyura binte Mohamed Fauzi, Singaporean rape and murder victim. 
2010 – Kristian Digby, English television host and director (b. 1977)
2012 – Andrew Breitbart, American journalist and publisher (b. 1969)
  2012   – Germano Mosconi, Italian journalist (b. 1932)
2013 – Bonnie Franklin, American actress, dancer, and singer (b. 1944)
2014 – Alain Resnais, French director, cinematographer, and screenwriter (b. 1922)
2015 – Minnie Miñoso, Cuban-American baseball player and coach (b. 1922)
2018 – María Rubio, Mexican television, film and stage actress (b. 1934)
2019 – Mike Willesee, Australian journalist and producer (b. 1942)

Holidays and observances
Beer Day, marked the end of beer prohibition in 1989 (Iceland)
Christian feast day:
Agnes Tsao Kou Ying (one of the Martyr Saints of China)
Albin
Eudokia of Heliopolis
Pope Felix III
Leoluca
Luperculus
Monan
Rudesind
Saint David's Day or Dydd Gŵyl Dewi (Wales and Welsh communities)
Suitbert
March 1 (Eastern Orthodox liturgics)
Commemoration of Mustafa Barzani's Death (Iraqi Kurdistan)
Disability Day of Mourning
Heroes' Day (Paraguay)
Independence Day, celebrates the independence of Bosnia and Herzegovina from Socialist Federal Republic of Yugoslavia in 1992.
National "Cursed Soldiers" Remembrance Day (Poland)
National Pig Day (United States)
Remembrance Day (Marshall Islands)
Samiljeol (South Korea)
Self-injury Awareness Day (international)
Southeastern Europe celebration of the beginning of spring:
Baba Marta Day (Bulgaria)
Mărțișor (Romania and Moldova)
The final day (fourth or fifth) of Ayyám-i-Há (Baháʼí Faith)
World Seagrass Day
Yap Day (Yap State)
Zero Discrimination Day

References

External links

 BBC: On This Day
 
 Historical Events on March 1

Days of the year
March